Senator Ten Eyck may refer to:

John C. Ten Eyck (1814–1879), U.S. Senator from New Jersey
Conrad Ten Eyck (1782–1847), Michigan State Senate
David Ten Eyck (born 1953), Minnesota State Senate